Gauweiler and Others v Deutscher Bundestag (2015) C-62/14 is an EU law case relevant for banking law which approved outright monetary transactions that were needed to save the Eurozone from financial turmoil.

Facts 
The German Constitutional Court asked the CJEU whether the European Central Bank buying government bonds issued by euro states (the ‘Outright Monetary Transactions’ programme), in a 6 September 2012 press release, was unlawful, either because it was economic policy, not monetary policy, or because it violated TFEU art 123(1) which prohibited monetary financing for member states. This followed a conservative German politician named Peter Gauweiler challenging the ability of the Eurozone to assist non-German member states that were in financial difficulty. The ECB said it would buy bonds on the secondary markets issued by states if (1) the state became subject to the European Financial Stability Facility assistance programme and the European Stability Mechanism (2) transactions focused on the shorter part of the yield curve (3) no quantitative limits were set in advance (4) the ECB got the same treatment as private creditors (5) the ECB undertook that liquidity created would be fully sterilised.

AG Cruz Villalon gave an opinion in favour of the EU policy.

Judgment
The Grand Chamber of the CJEU held that the European Central Bank could adopt a programme to buy government bonds on the secondary markets under TFEU articles 119, 123, 127 and articles 17 to 24 of Protocol (No 4) on the Statute of the European System of Central Banks and of the European Central Bank. The outright monetary transaction programme was monetary policy, and measures taken were proportionate to the objectives without contravening TFEU art 123.

See also

United Kingdom enterprise law

Notes

References

Court of Justice of the European Union case law
United Kingdom enterprise case law